Angel Romaeo (born 14 August 1997) is a Welsh artistic gymnast. She competed for Wales at the 2014 Commonwealth Games in Glasgow, Scotland, and was a member of the team that won the bronze medal in the Team all-around competition.

Romaeo comes from a Cardiff family and is one of six children, all of whom are involved in competitive sport.

References 

1997 births
Welsh female artistic gymnasts
Living people
Sportspeople from Cardiff
Commonwealth Games bronze medallists for Wales
Gymnasts at the 2014 Commonwealth Games
Commonwealth Games medallists in gymnastics
Medallists at the 2014 Commonwealth Games